Demetrius was bishop of Antioch in the 3rd century AD. In 253 he was taken to Persia as a captive by Shapur I, where he became the first bishop of Gundeshapur. Despite being far from his original see, Demetrius was not replaced as bishop of Antioch until Paul of Samosata became bishop in 260.

References

Sources
 

Christians in the Sasanian Empire
Roman prisoners of war
Iranian people of Roman descent
Christians in the Roman Empire
3rd-century bishops in Roman Anatolia